Wynnewood is a neighborhood in Dallas, Texas (USA). The village was once known for buildings having old decorative wood flooring.

The United States Air Force, Air Defense Command, maintained a Filter Center in the
Wynnewood Professional Building, during the late 1950s.  The filter center recorded 
all air traffic (and many tornadoes) in its 72,000 thousand square mile area of 
responsibility, which reached from Muleshoe in the west, to Ranger in the east, and
up to the Red River, and Lake Texoma.

History 

The history of Wynnewood is inextricably connected with the development of suburban living in post-World War II America. Indeed, Wynnewood is the southern equivalent of the famous Levittown, New York, a planned community with which Wynnewood is exactly contemporaneous. However, the parallels do not end there.

Just as Levittown was named after Levitt and Sons, the company that planned and built the suburb, so Wynnewood carries the name of the Wynne family. The  that were to become Wynnewood were originally purchased in 1913 by the American Home Realty Company, but remained undeveloped until the 1940s; at that point the company was acquired by Toddie Lee Wynne Sr. and Benjamin Hick Majors. When Wynne's nephew Angus Gilchrist Wynne Jr., returned from the war, he was appointed president of American Home Realty. His task was to take advantage of the post-war boom, which was propitious for housing development.

Construction took place in several phases. It started in March, 1946, in the triangle marked by Illinois, Bristol, and Garapan. The first homes to be completed were those on Veasy Street (later renamed Wynnewood Drive). The first resident to occupy a Wynnewood home was J. D. Jones of 2342 Veasy. The entire development was largely complete by 1954.

Conception of the "City of Wynnewood, U.S.A." 

Angus Wynne and his architect, Roscoe DeWitt, conceived of Wynnewood as "one-self-contained community," as the American Home Realty Company declared in a contemporary advertisement. Another contemporary ad referred to the "City of Wynnewood, U.S.A." Of course, the Wynnewood community did not grow organically over decades or even centuries, like traditional cities; it reflected the carefully thought-out blueprint of its creators. Wynnewood was to consist of 2,200 homes and 1,000 apartments, with a large shopping area at their center. The homes cost between $6,000 and $20,000, ranging from modest floor plans in the original core of Wynnewood to upscale residences in Wynnewood North. The mix of apartments and homes in different price ranges ensured a certain socio-economic diversity; racial diversity, on the other hand, was not yet conceivable: the community was initially all-white.

In Wynnewood, Wynne and DeWitt attempted to marry the principles of mass production with individuality. In Wynnewood, one would not find "regimented rows upon rows of houses, [or] dreadful uniformity." Indeed, the homes in the Wynnewood community have a sufficient diversity of styles and layouts not to appear like "cookie-cutter" houses. Nevertheless, they were built with great efficiency, from components manufactured in specially established "pre-fabrication mills." A contemporary article describes the work method of the construction teams in the following words:

Employing nearly 300 workers, one-third of whom are carpenters, the contractors have their forces set up in skilled groups specializing in their fields. For example, the employees include groups such as wall erection, rafter erection, frame gables, window and door frames. The groups start down a street in the addition, taking each house in order, and with the completion of their repetitive work on that street, cross over and return down the next street, working much on the order of an assembly line. Following are brick masons who are equipped to complete one house daily.

Great emphasis was placed on the quality of workmanship. For example, the electric wiring in the Wynnewood community followed the standards of the Dallas Adequate Wiring Committee, set up to promote the kind of wiring that would be able to handle the expanding use of electricity for household appliances.

The streets at the core of Wynnewood are named after WWII Navy commanders, ships, and battles: for example, Eisenhower, Salerno, Nicholson, Garapan, Anzio, Grayson, O'Banion, and Bristol. This reflects Angus Wynne's Navy career. DeWitt Circle commemorates the architect.

Wynnewood Shopping Village 

Unlike modern-day developers, who often fail to provide neighborhoods with the facilities necessary for everyday life, Wynne and his advisers planned a large shopping center at the heart of their community. There was a movie theater, a post office, the Wynnewood State Bank, department stores, grocery stores, drugstores, restaurants, furniture and jewelry stores, doctors' offices, and even a hotel. What made (and still makes) the Wynnewood Shopping Center unique is the fact that it is laid out like a "village": shops are not crammed into one huge air-conditioned complex, but are housed in blocks of one-story buildings surrounded by trees.

In 2018, the current owner of Wynnewood Village shopping center invested $30 million into improving the shopping center over the next few years.

Wynnewood today 

The following images give an impression of Wynnewood as it looked in 2008.

Sources 

The Archives for Dallas and Texas History of the Dallas Public Library has a collection of materials relating to the history of Wynnewood: newspaper clippings, photographs, magazine articles, etc. Call number: MA 03.4 ("Wynnewood Scrapbook"). The Public Works and Transportation Survey Records Vault of the City of Dallas contains plats, legal documents, aerial photographs, and some house plans on the Wynnewood neighborhood. The Vault is located at 320 E. Jefferson Blvd., Room 314, Dallas, Texas, 75203.

The Hidden City: Oak Cliff, Texas, by Bill Minutaglio and Holly Williams (Dallas: Elmwood Press and The Old Oak Cliff Conservation League, 1990), focuses on the earlier history of Oak Cliff and mentions Wynnewood only in passing.

References

External links 
 Old Oak Cliff Conservation League
 Wynnewood North Neighborhood Association
 Documentary short film about Wynnewood North

Neighborhoods in Oak Cliff, Dallas
Neighborhoods in Dallas